Petr Vampola (born January 21, 1982) is a Czech professional ice hockey centre who currently plays for the Hc Vsetín of the Chance liga.

International career
Vampola competed at the 2010 Men's World Ice Hockey Championships as a member of the Czech Republic men's national ice hockey team, where he won a gold medal.

Career statistics

Regular season and playoffs

International

References

External links

Living people
1982 births
Czech ice hockey centres
Avangard Omsk players
Genève-Servette HC players
HC Bílí Tygři Liberec players
HC Plzeň players
Salavat Yulaev Ufa players
Timrå IK players
Traktor Chelyabinsk players
VHK Vsetín players
People from Žďár nad Sázavou
Sportspeople from the Vysočina Region
Rytíři Kladno players
Motor České Budějovice players
BK Mladá Boleslav players
Czech expatriate ice hockey players in Sweden
Czech expatriate ice hockey players in Russia
Czech expatriate ice hockey players in Switzerland
Växjö Lakers players